Seyyid Emir Mehmed Pasha, known by the epithet "al-Sharif" among his Arab subjects, was an Ottoman statesman who served as defterdar (finance minister) (1589–1593, 1595), Ottoman governor of Egypt (1596–1598), and Ottoman governor of Damascus (1599–1600).

He was a descendant of Hussein ibn Ali, earning him the epithet "sayyid." While he was the governor of Egypt (with the title beylerbey, often known as viceroy), he was reportedly a frequent visitor of the Al-Hussein Mosque in Cairo. In 1599, he became a vizier.

See also
 List of Ottoman Ministers of Finance
 List of Ottoman governors of Egypt
 List of Ottoman governors of Damascus

References

 Süreyya, Bey M, Nuri Akbayar, and Seyit A. Kahraman. Sicill-i Osmanî. Beşiktaş, İstanbul: Kültür Bakanlığı ile Türkiye Ekonomik ve Toplumsal Tarih Vakfı'nın ortak yayınıdır, 1996. Print.

Pashas
16th-century births
17th-century deaths
16th-century Ottoman governors of Egypt
17th-century people from the Ottoman Empire
Ottoman governors of Egypt
Ottoman governors of Damascus
Defterdar